The following is the list of awards and nominations received by the American science fiction television series Star Trek: Deep Space Nine.

ASCAP Film and Television Music Awards

American Society of Cinematographers, USA

Art Directors Guild

Emmy Award

Hugo Awards

Image Awards

International Monitor Awards

Motion Picture Sound Editors, USA

Satellite Awards

Saturn Award

Sci-Fi Universe Magazine

Young Artist Awards

YoungStar Awards

See also
List of Star Trek: The Original Series awards and nominations
List of Star Trek: The Next Generation awards and nominations
List of Star Trek: Voyager awards and nominations
List of Star Trek: Enterprise awards and nominations
List of Star Trek: Discovery awards and nominations

Notes

References

External links
 Awards for Star Trek: Deep Space Nine at IMDb

Deep Space
Awards